Przerwa may refer to:

Przerwa, Łódź Voivodeship, Poland
Przerwa, Opole Voivodeship, Poland

See also
 
Kazimierz Przerwa-Tetmajer (1865–1940), Polish poet